David Packer may refer to:

 David Packer (artist) (born 1960), American and English artist
 David Packer (actor) (born 1962), American actor

See also
 David Pecker (born 1951), American publisher